Tomás Monje assumed office as the interim 41st President of Bolivia on 17 August 1946, and his mandate ended on 10 March 1947. The President of the Superior District Court of La Paz, Monje was chosen to lead an interim junta following the violent overthrow of President Gualberto Villarroel on 21 July 1946. Having been ill at the time, Monje only assumed the position 27 days later, chairing the junta until new elections could be held.

Monje formed one cabinet nine days after taking office, constituting the 113th national cabinet of Bolivia as part of the 1946–1947 Government Junta.

Cabinet Ministers

Composition 

All previous members of the cabinet of Néstor Guillén including Guillén himself remained in office upon the assumption of Monje as interim president. They were dismissed when Monje formed his own cabinet on 26 August, with the exception of Secretary-General Roberto Bilbao la Vieja, Foreign Minister Aniceto Solares, and Minister of Work and Social Security Aurelio Alcoba who remained in their positions for the duration of Monje's mandate. The newly appointed members were Julio César Canelas (Defense), Eduardo Saenz García (Economy), Carlos Muñoz Roldán (Public Works), Manuel Elías P. (Education), and José Saavedra Suárez (Agriculture).

The civil junta and Monje's mandate ended on 10 March 1947 upon the inauguration of Enrique Hertzog, the winner of the 1947 general elections.

Gallery

Notes

References

Bibliography 

 

Cabinets of Bolivia
Cabinets established in 1946
Cabinets disestablished in 1947
1946 establishments in Bolivia